Wheatley railway station was  on the Wycombe Railway and served the village of Wheatley in Oxfordshire.

It was opened in 1864 as part of an extension from Thame to Oxford. The railway crossed the steep road of Ladder Hill by a bridge. The station was on the east side of Ladder Hill.

In January 1963 British Railways withdrew passenger services between Princes Risborough and Oxford, and closed all intermediate stations including Wheatley. The station and route were included in the 1963 Beeching Report, even though passenger services had already ended. Some goods services and diverted passenger trains continued along the line until the track was closed between Thame and Morris Cowley in 1968.

Kelham Hall Drive and Kimber Close have been built on the site of Wheatley station. One of the pub's bars is decorated with many items of railway memorabilia, some of which relate to the former railway through Wheatley station.

References

Disused railway stations in Oxfordshire
Former Great Western Railway stations
Railway stations in Great Britain opened in 1864
Railway stations in Great Britain closed in 1963